Douglas County is a county in the northwestern part of the U.S. state of Nevada. As of the 2020 Census, the population was 49,488. Its county seat is Minden. Douglas County comprises the Gardnerville Ranchos, NV Micropolitan Statistical Area, which is also included in the Reno–Carson City–Fernley, NV Combined Statistical Area.

History
The town of Genoa in Douglas County was the first permanent settlement in Nevada.  Genoa was settled in 1851 by Mormon traders selling goods to settlers on their way to California. Named for Stephen A. Douglas, famous for his 1860 Presidential campaign and debates with Abraham Lincoln, Douglas County was one of the first nine counties formed in 1861 by the Nevada territorial legislature.

The county seat is Minden, after having been moved from Genoa in 1915.

Various services run by the county include parks, law enforcement, road maintenance, building inspection, and the Minden–Tahoe Airport.

Fire protection and emergency medical services are provided by the Tahoe-Douglas Fire Protection District at the lake and the East Fork Fire Protection District for the rest of the county.

Geography
It is the second-smallest county in Nevada by area. The highest point is East Peak at 9,593 ft (2,924 m), while the most topographically prominent mountain is Mount Siegel.

Douglas County is in western Nevada in the western United States. Stretching from Carson Valley and running up into the Sierra Nevada, the county is bordered on the west by California, and contains about 13.2% of Lake Tahoe, which is split across the two states. Carson City, the state capital, lies to the north, and Lyon County to the east.

Adjacent counties and city
 Carson City – north
 Lyon County – east
 Mono County, California – southeast
 Alpine County, California – south
 El Dorado County, California – west
 Placer County, California – northwest

National protected area
 Toiyabe National Forest

Transportation

Public Transportation With Douglas County is offered by Douglas Area Rural Transit, Tahoe Transportation District and Eastern Sierra Transit

Major highways

  U.S. Route 50
  U.S. Route 395
  State Route 28
  State Route 88
  State Route 206
  State Route 207
  State Route 208
  State Route 756
  State Route 757
  State Route 759
  State Route 760

Demographics

2000 census
As of the census of 2000, there were 41,259 people, 16,401 households, and 11,890 families living in the county.  The population density was 58 people per square mile (22/km2).  There were 19,006 housing units at an average density of 27 per square mile (10/km2).  The racial makeup of the county was 91.9% White, 0.3% Black or African American, 1.7% Native American, 1.3% Asian, 0.2% Pacific Islander, 2.5% from other races, and 2.2% from two or more races.  7.4% of the population were Hispanic or Latino of any race.

There were 16,401 households, out of which 30.7% had children under the age of 18 living with them, 60.5% were married couples living together, 8.0% had a female householder with no husband present, and 27.5% were non-families. 20.7% of all households were made up of individuals, and 6.6% had someone living alone who was 65 years of age or older.  The average household size was 2.50 and the average family size was 2.88.

In the county, the population was spread out, with 24.0% under the age of 18, 5.5% from 18 to 24, 26.4% from 25 to 44, 28.9% from 45 to 64, and 15.2% who were 65 years of age or older.  The median age was 42 years. For every 100 females there were 102.1 males.  For every 100 females age 18 and over, there were 100.7 males.

The median income for a household in the county was $51,849, and the median income for a family was $57,092. Males had a median income of $40,436 versus $28,762 for females. The per capita income for the county was $27,288.  About 5.8% of families and 7.3% of the population were below the poverty line, including 9.7% of those under age 18 and 5.3% of those age 65 or over.

2010 census
As of the 2010 United States Census, there were 46,997 people, 19,638 households, and 13,519 families living in the county. The racial makeup of the county was 89.6% white, 1.9% Native American, 1.5% Asian, 0.4% black or African American, 0.1% Pacific islander, 3.2% from other races, and 3.1% from two or more races. Those of Hispanic or Latino origin made up 10.9% of the population. In terms of ancestry, 25.7% were German, 17.5% were English, 14.9% were Irish, 8.0% were Italian, and 4.1% were American.

Of the 19,638 households, 26.7% had children under the age of 18 living with them, 55.5% were married couples living together, 8.9% had a female householder with no husband present, 31.2% were non-families, and 24.0% of all households were made up of individuals. The average household size was 2.38 and the average family size was 2.80. The median age was 47.4 years.

The median income for a household in the county was $60,721 and the median income for a family was $73,543. Males had a median income of $52,001 versus $39,825 for females. The per capita income for the county was $35,239. About 5.4% of families and 7.9% of the population were below the poverty line, including 10.8% of those under age 18 and 6.1% of those age 65 or over.

Communities

Census-designated places
There are no incorporated towns or cities in Douglas County.  The following communities are census-designated places, meaning population and demographic data is available from the U.S. Census Bureau for each one:

 Carter Springs
 Double Spring
 East Valley
 Fish Springs
 Gardnerville
 Gardnerville Ranchos
 Genoa
 Glenbrook
 Indian Hills
 Johnson Lane
 Kingsbury
 Lakeridge
 Logan Creek
 Minden (county seat)
 Round Hill Village
 Ruhenstroth
 Skyland
 Stateline
 Topaz Lake
 Topaz Ranch Estates
 Zephyr Cove

Unincorporated communities
 Centerville
 Dresslerville
 Holbrook Junction
 Mottsville
 Sheridan

Politics
Historically Douglas was the most Republican county in Nevada, a state that tended to lean Democratic between the 1890s and 1950s. The last Democrat to carry the county was Franklin D. Roosevelt in 1936 during his 48-state landslide over Alf Landon, and even then, he carried Douglas by 15 percent less than his statewide margin. It was the only Nevada county won by Charles Evans Hughes in 1916, and one of only two to vote for Progressive “Bull Moose” ex-President Theodore Roosevelt in 1912. It was also one of only two Nevada counties that voted for incumbent President Benjamin Harrison over insurgent Populist James B. Weaver in 1892 when the latter carried the state by over 40 percentage points. Even when the county did vote Democratic in 1896 and 1900, it was by much smaller margins than the rest of silver-mining Nevada.

The county remains a Republican stronghold, although it now is not quite as heavily Republican as some other rural counties in the state. Apart from FDR's two victories, only two Democrats since 1920 — Lyndon Johnson in 1964 and Barack Obama in 2008 — have won even 40 percent of the county’s vote. Despite the county's strong Republican bent, residents tend to be somewhat moderate on social issues, with a small majority of county residents voting to legalize gay marriage in 2020.

Economy

Major employers
 Starbucks roasting plant
 Patmont Motor Werks
 Bently Nevada, part of Baker Hughes
 North Sails
 TeslaWatt

Education
Douglas County's education is managed by the Douglas County School District.  It serves for all of Douglas County, having two main areas: Lake Tahoe & the Carson Valley. Douglas High School also serves most of the high school age students from Alpine County, California

Lake Tahoe
 George Whittell High School
 Zephyr Cove Elementary School

Carson Valley

 Douglas High School
 Aspire Academy High School
 Carson Valley Middle School
 Pau-Wa-Lu Middle School
 Gardnerville Elementary School
 Minden Elementary School
 Jacks Valley Elementary School
 Piñion Hills Elementary School
 Gene L. Scarselli Elementary School
 C.C. Meneley Elementary School

Private schools
 Sierra Lutheran High School
 Faith Christian Academy
 Grace Christian Academy

Media
 Carson Valley Times
 The Record-Courier

In popular culture
 Smokin Aces
 Charley Varrick
 The Shootist
 Misery
 The Motel Life

See also

 National Register of Historic Places listings in Douglas County, Nevada

References

External links
 
 The Record Courier – Local newspaper
 Carson Valley Chamber of Commerce & Visitors Authority
 Douglas County School District
 Carson Valley Area Weather

 
1861 establishments in Nevada Territory
Populated places established in 1861